Alberto Lati Mercado (born 20 June 1978) is a Mexican journalist and writer. Graduated in Communication Sciences at Iberoamerican University.  Lati currently does play-by-play for Fox Sports and host a program called Agenda Fox Sports and Latitude Fox. Moreover, he is a commentator at  Claro Sports, and writes for Diario 24 Horas newspaper. During the 2018 FIFA World Cup, he hosted Russia Latitude for National Geographic. The program documented the most important historical places in Russia weaving history, politic, culture, and soccer. The sportscaster worked for Televisa, the biggest multimedia mass media company in Mexico, from 1995 to 2016. His first book "Latitudes: Crónica, viaje y balón", his first published in 2013 was reissued and became a bestseller in 2016.

Career 
Lati has been sport's correspondent, among others, in the Olympics, Super Bowl, European Football Championship and Copa Libertadores. As a reporter, Lati has visited almost 100 countries and lived in Tokyo, Madrid, Athens, Munich, Beijing, Johannesburg, and London. The journalist carried the torch of the London Olympics on July 6, 2012. It must be emphasized his active participation with ACNUR campaigns on refugees dilemmas. In July 2021 Lati is announced as an UNHCR Goodwill Ambassador for Mexico.

In 2021 he became a fellow member of HYPIA, The International Association of Hyperpolyglots. Moreover, Lati was awarded as outstanding journalist at the World Knowledge Summit 2021 with an honorary doctorate. Due to his interest in studying multiple languages he speaks Spanish, Hebrew, English, French, Italian, Greek, German, Mandarin Chinese, isiZulu, Portuguese, Russian, and Japanese. His noteworthy interviews include Nobel Prize laureates: Malala Yousafza, Dalai Lama, Rigoberta Menchú and Óscar Arias, Olympic swimmer Michael Phelps, tennis champ Roger Federer, football stars: Diego Armando Maradona, Pelé and Cristiano Ronaldo,  and "the fastest man alive" Usain Bolt. In addition, he has interviewed famous political leaders, cultural figures  and famous actors, such as, Lech Walesa, Frederik de Klerk, Shimon Peres, Georgios Papandreu, Ban Ki-moon, Nadine Gordimer, Carlos Fuentes, Madonna, Peter Gabriel, John Paul Jones, Chris Cornell, George Clooney, Keira Knightley, Mia Farrow y Ralph Fiennes, Scorpions, Muse, Zubin Mehta and Plácido Domingo.

Writer 
Lati narrates his experiences around the world in "Latitudes: Crónica, viaje y balón", his first published book and bestseller in 2016. In 2018 he published his first novel "Aquí, Borya". In May 2020 he published "100 Dioses del Olimpo: De niños a Superhéroes" and "20 pelotazos de esperanza en tiempos de crisis".

Publications 

 "Latitudes: Crónica, viaje y balón" - 2013 
 "Aquí, Borya" - 2018 
 "100 genios del balón" - 2019 
 "100 Dioses del Olimpo: De niños a Superhéroes " - 2020 
"20 pelotazos de esperanza en tiempos de crisis" - 2020  
"Genios de Qatar. De niños a cracks Pasta blanda"- 2022 ISBN 9786073816311

References

External links 
 

1978 births
Mexican sports journalists
Living people